The 2007 season was Bunyodkor's first season in the Uzbek League in Uzbekistan. Bunyodkor competed in the Uzbek League, and was runner up for the Uzbek Cup.

Squad

Transfers

In

Out

Competitions

Uzbek League

League table

Results summary

Results by round

Results

Uzbekistan Cup

Final

Squad statistics

Appearances and goals

|-
|colspan="14"|Players who left Bunyodkor during the season:

|}

Goal scorers

Clean sheets

Disciplinary Record

References

External links

 Official Website 
 Championat.uz 

Bunyodkor
Sport in Tashkent
FC Bunyodkor seasons